Paul Dobransky, also known as "Dr. Paul", is an American physician, book author, psychiatrist, television and radio personality, magazine writer, speaker, and CEO of several websites. He was born in Pittsburgh, Pennsylvania and is currently living in New York City, New York.

Dr. Dobransky delivers seminars on dating and relationships to men and women in Chicago, Montreal, and London, and seminars using Mind OS (a synthesis of the disciplines of psychology) to instruct on character maturity, personal growth, communication, decision-making and team-building, as well as gender communication. He has appeared on television programs including The Bachelor, NBC's Nightline, Anderson Cooper 360°, and Fox News.

He also owns a personality temperament diagram used to analyze social and person interaction called King Warrior Magician Lover (KMWL) as well as streaming podcasts for NBC on sex, dating, and relationships.

Dobransky has been a guest speaker in several programs by David DeAngelo, and appeared in numerous television journalism programs (CNN, Fox News National, NBC's Nightline), on radio (currently he is a weekly guest on a syndicated radio show, 2nd Shift, with host Alan Kabel), and print media, including the magazines Maxim, Men's Health, Men's Fitness, Men's Journal, Cosmopolitan, Marie Claire, First For Women, Women's Health, Self, and Psychology Today.

Books
The Power of Female Friendship (2008) 
The Secret Psychology of How We Fall in Love (2007) 
The Tortoise and Hare Quit the Rat Race: Fulfillment Through Brief Solution-Focused Psychoanalysis (2003) 
Bathsheba (2005) 
Get Your Send On (eBook)

References

External links
 
 
 

American psychiatrists
Living people
Writers from Pittsburgh
1967 births